Brodhead is a ghost town in Las Animas County, Colorado, United States.

Introduction 

The town site is about 2.25 miles (3.6 km) north of Aguilar on the western side of Interstate 25 approximately 18 miles (29 km) north of the town of Trinidad. Nearby points of interest include the Ludlow Monument, a monument to the coal miners and their families who were killed in the 1914 Ludlow Massacre.

The population was a mix of Mexican and European immigrants. Some of the miners are known to have come from Stafford, England

Evolution of the Town 

Brodhead was a mining town built and owned by a company formed by three brothers: Henry C. Brodhead (President) who was married to the author Eva Wilder Brodhead, Albert G. Brodhead (Vice President), and Robert S. Brodhead (Secretary and General Manager) and operated between the late 1890s and the mid 1960s. The Brodhead brothers had previously operated a mine in Gonzales Canyon between 1896 and 1899. Initially the town was built as a company town

1911 

The 1911 Gazetter Publishing Company Business Directory listing for Brodhead, Las Animas Co. describes the town as:

Coal mining town in Las Animas county, 2 1/4 miles north of Aguilar, the railroad point. Stage to Aguilar and Lynn. Population 300.

And lists notable residents as:

Carl V. Bates, Physician
F Baudina, General Merchandise Store, G B Norman (Manager)
Howell & Bennett, Boarding House
Las Animas Coal Co, Win Burt (Superintendent)
E C Reck Jr., Postmaster (The Post Office had opened on Aug 14th 1902 and was closed on April 15th 1913 )
J M Williams, Saloon

1929 

The 1929 edition of the American Mining & Metallurgical Manual lists the Temple Fuel Company operating in the canyon  as:

F.R. Wood, Trinidad, Colorado, President, General Manager.
Alexander Shields, Brodhead, Colorado, Superintendent.
Brodhead Colliery, (110,000 Tons) Slope. Steam Electric Plant.
7 Electrical Coal Cutters. Trolley Electric Locomotives, 200 Men.

A Post Office had also re-opened on July 19, 1915, only to close again on Apr 29th 1939

Mining around Brodhead 

There were a number of mines in the canyon:

Deaths in the Mines 

There are a number of deaths known at the mines, which, in common with all mining then and now was a dangerous occupation, including:

References 

Ghost towns in Colorado
Company towns in Colorado
Former populated places in Las Animas County, Colorado